Lip, A Feminist Arts Journal, or just Lip, was an Australian interdisciplinary feminist art journal, published between 1976 and 1984. It was the first of its kind in Australia.

The magazine was founded by Suzanne Spunner, who had been involved in the organising of the International Women's Film Festival in 1975.

The magazine was self-published by a feminist collective during the era of the women's liberation movement, and its content included a very wide range of feminist positions and interdisciplinary art forms, in addition to work that connected the local scene to a more international network. The magazine was based in Carlton, Victoria.

The Lip collective also organised art shows, curated critical essays, and additionally published the Earthworks Poster Collective, The Women’s Theatre Group and The Women’s Film Group.

In 2013 Vivian Ziherl published an anthology of Lip articles.

References

Bibliography
 The Lip Anthology, Vivian Ziherl (ed.), Kunstverein Publishing, Macmillan Art Publishing, 2013

1976 establishments in Australia
1984 disestablishments in Australia
Defunct magazines published in Australia
Feminism in Australia
Feminist magazines
Magazines established in 1976
Magazines disestablished in 1984
Mass media in Victoria (Australia)
Women's magazines published in Australia
Australian artist groups and collectives